Attack in the Pacific (also known by the American series title: Armed Forces Information Film: A.F.I.F. Number 3) is a 1944 American war documentary film.

Cast 
 Henry H. Arnold as himself (with Marshall) (archive footage)
 Alan Brooke as himself (at Cairo Conference) (archive footage)
 Chiang Kai-shek as himself (at Cairo Conference) (archive footage)
 Winston Churchill as himself (at Cairo Conference) (archive footage)
 Andrew Cunningham as himself (at Cairo Conference) (archive footage)
 John Dill as himself (at Anglo-American conference) (archive footage)
 James Doolittle as himself (walks deck of Hornet with Mitscher) (archive footage)
 William F. Halsey as himself (on deck) (archive footage)
 Hastings Ismay as himself (at Cairo Conference) (archive footage)
 Ernest J. King as himself (at Cairo Conference, in USMC uniform) (archive footage)
 William D. Leahy as himself (at Cairo Conference) (archive footage)
 Wei Liu as himself (at Cairo Conference) (archive footage)
 George C. Marshall as himself (at Anglo-American conference) (archive footage)
 Marc A. Mitscher as himself (commander, USS Hornet) (archive footage)
 Louis Mountbatten as himself (at Cairo Conference) (archive footage)
 Chester W. Nimitz as himself (decorates soldier) (archive footage)
 Charles Portal as himself (at Cairo Conference) (archive footage)
 Lewis B. Puller as himself (on Peleliu, holds helmet) (archive footage)
 Sam Rayburn as himself (in Congress behind FDR) (archive footage)
 Franklin Delano Roosevelt as himself (Day of Infamy speech) (archive footage)
 James Roosevelt as himself (in Congress beside FDR) (archive footage)
 William H. Rupertus as himself (on Peleliu, beside Puller) (archive footage)
 Chen Shang as himself (at Cairo Conference) (archive footage)
 Raymond A. Spruance as himself (studies map with Nimitz) (archive footage)
 Joseph W. Stilwell as himself (at Cairo Conference) (archive footage)
 Henry Wallace as himself (in Congress behind FDR) (archive footage)
 David Raksin

External links 
 
 

1944 films
American World War II propaganda films
American black-and-white films
Documentary films about World War II
Films scored by David Raksin
1940s war films
1944 documentary films
American documentary films
American war films
Pacific War films